Let's Roll is the twenty-sixth studio album by Etta James. It won a Grammy Award for Best Contemporary Blues Album in 2003, and also won a W. C. Handy Award as the Soul/Blues Album of the Year from the Blues Foundation in 2004.

Track listing
"Somebody to Love" – 5:58  (Delbert McClinton, Gary Nicholson)
"The Blues Is My Business" – 3:33 (Kevin Bowe, Todd Cerney)
"Leap of Faith" – 4:00 (Glen Clarke, Nicholson)
"Strongest Weakness" – 4:53 (Bekka Bramlett, Nicholson)
"Wayward Saints of Memphis" – 5:42 (Bowe, McClinton)
"Lie No Better" – 3:31 (Nicholson)
"Trust Yourself" – 4:45 (Bowe, Grady Champion)
"A Change Is Gonna Do Me Good" – 5:23 (Al Anderson, Bob DiPiero)
"Old Weakness" – 3:12 (Nicholson)
"Stacked Deck" – 8:01 (Billy Wright)
"On the 7th Day" – 5:01 (Bowe, Kostas)
"Please, No More" – 4:40 (David Egan, Greg Hansen)

Personnel
Josh Sklair - Banjo, Guitar (12 String), Guitar (Acoustic), Guitar (Electric), Slide Guitar, Synthesizer
Donto James - Drums, Percussion, Vocals
Sametto James - Bass guitar
Tom Poole - Trumpet
Lee Thornburg - Trombone
Jimmy "Z" Zavala - Harmonica, Saxophone (Baritone), Saxophone (Tenor)
Bobby Murray - electric guitar

References

2003 albums
Etta James albums
Grammy Award for Best Contemporary Blues Album
Private Music albums